Nicosia Turkish Cypriot Municipality is the governing body of North Nicosia province of TRNC. It was established in 1958 and was recognized by Article 173 of the Constitution of the Republic of Cyprus. After 1974 and the Turkish invasion of Cyprus, it became the municipality of North Nicosia. The current mayor is Mehmet Harmancı.

Mayors of North Nicosia
Below is a list of mayors of the Nicosia Turkish Municipality since its establishment in 1958:

See also
Nicosia Municipality

References

External links
 Official website of Nicosia Turkish Municipality

Nicosia
Government of Northern Cyprus